Moyukh Chowdhury (born 22 October 1950) is a Bangladeshi poet, critic, researcher and professor. He has published poetry and research. He has drawn attention from readers since the 1980s.

Background

Moyukh Chowdhury was born in Chittagong in 1950. He spent his childhood in bank of the Karnaphuli south of Chittagong.

Bibliography

Poetry
 Kaalo Boropher Pratibeshee (1973)
 Ardhek Roechi Jale, Ardhek Jale (1999)
 Tomar Janalay Jege Aachhi Chandramallika (2000)
 Pariser Neelruti (2001)
 Amar Astey Akto Deri Hotey Parey (2002)
 palatok pendulam (2015)

Researches 
 Unish Shatoker Nobocetona O Bangla Kabber Goti-Prokriti (1996)

Editorials 
 Asobhyo Swabda (1973)

Literary magazine
 Prateeti (1968)
 Kabita (1970)

Awards and honor

See also

References

External links 
 ময়ুখ চৌধুরীর কবিতায় প্রসঙ্গ - Dainik Azadi
 Moyukh Chowdhury in Amazon.com
 books of Moyukh Chowdhury in Rokomary.com

1950 births
Bengali-language writers
Bengali writers
20th-century Bengali poets
20th-century Bangladeshi poets
Bengali-language literature
21st-century Bengali poets
University of Chittagong alumni
Living people
21st-century Bangladeshi poets
Bengali male poets
Bangladeshi male poets
People from Chittagong
20th-century Bangladeshi male writers
21st-century male writers
Writers from Chittagong